The 1895–96 St Helens R.F.C. season was the club's first in the Northern Rugby Football Union, following the dispute and split with the Rugby Football Union. In a difficult season, the club finished fourteenth out of 22 teams in the national competition, having two points deducted from their league total for fielding an ineligible player, and seventh in the concurrent Lancashire Senior Championship.

National Championship

League points: for win = 2; for draw = 1; for loss = 0.
Pld = Games played; W = Wins; D = Draws; L = Losses; PF = Match points scored; PA = Match points conceded; PD = Points difference; Pts = League points.
Notes

References

St Helens R.F.C. seasons
St Helens RLFC season
St Helens RLFC season